Quercus or oak, is a genus of trees and shrubs.

Quercus may also refer to:

Organization
 Quercus (organization), a Portuguese association for the conservation of the natural environment
 Quercus (publisher), a British publishing house
 Quercus, developer of a Rexx interpreter

Other uses
 Quercus (software), a Java implementation of the PHP language
 Quercus (album), a 2013 album by June Tabor, Huw Warren & Iain Ballamy

See also
 List of Quercus species
 Quercia (disambiguation)